Carex simulata is a species of sedge known by the common name analogue sedge.

Description
Carex simulata produces sharply triangular stems up to 80 centimeters tall from a long, coarse, dark brown rhizome. The inflorescence is dense and rounded to open and long, containing several flower spikes.

The plant is generally dioecious, with individual plants bearing male or female flowers, but not both. The male, staminate inflorescence is usually longer and more narrow than the oval-shaped female, pistillate spike. Female flowers bear fruits which are coated in dark brown, shiny, pointed perigynia.

Distribution and habitat
This sedge is native to the western United States and western Canada, where it grows in many types of wet habitat, from mountain meadows to ditches, often in alkaline conditions.

References

External links
Carex simulata - Photo gallery

simulata
Flora of Nevada
Flora of California
Flora of the Sierra Nevada (United States)
Flora of the Great Basin
Flora of the Western United States
Plants described in 1908
Flora without expected TNC conservation status